The Norwich Free Academy (NFA), founded in 1854 and in operation since 1856, is a coeducational independent school for students between the 9th and 12th grade. Located in Norwich, Connecticut, the Academy serves as the primary high school for Norwich and the surrounding towns of Canterbury, Bozrah, Voluntown, Sprague, Lisbon, Franklin, Preston, and Brooklyn. It was recognized by the U.S. Department of Education as a National Blue Ribbon School of Excellence in 2001.

Incorporated in 1855 by an act of the Connecticut Legislature, the Academy is an independent school and operates as a privately endowed educational institution that is governed by its board of trustees. One of the state's three endowed, independent academies, the Connecticut State Department of Education refers to the Academy as "a privately governed, endowed, regional independent school."

In addition to serving Norwich and surrounding communities, NFA also educates private tuition students.  NFA is a member of the Connecticut Association of Independent Schools.

History
In 2017 the NFA administration protested against a Governor of Connecticut Dannel P. Malloy's Senate Bill 786, which requires trustees of any "incorporated or endowed high school or academy" to publicly post each "schedule, agenda and minutes of each meeting". SB 786 also allows for area school districts that send students to NFA to have seats on the NFA board of representatives. It also allows public hearings and reviews by area boards of education of portions of NFA's budget, as well as the auditing the NFA revenues each year.

The bill ultimately was modified; it continued to allow area boards of education to review the NFA budget and hold public hearings and requiring annual auditing, but the requirement that area school boards have representatives on the NFA board was removed. On March 24 the Education Committee of the Connecticut General Assembly approved this revised version. The NFA administration expressed satisfaction over this outcome.

Campus

The 38 acre main campus contains seven buildings that are listed in the National Register of Historic Places, the most prominent being the Slater Memorial Museum.

Varsity sport teams

Football rivalry
The oldest high school football rivalry in the United States is between Norwich Free Academy and New London High School. The first meeting between NFA and the Bulkeley School for Boys occurred on May 12, 1875; Bulkeley merged with Chapman Technical High School in 1951 to become New London High School and the rivalry with NFA continued. The games have been noncontinuous, interrupted by World War I and a 2-year hiatus after a brawl in 1951. Some years saw them play against each other more than once a season. The two teams played their 153rd game in November 2014.

Notable alumni
Dan Dale Alexander (1937) – nutrition quack known as "the Codfather"
John-Manuel Andriote (1976) – author and journalist
Allyn L. Brown (1901) – lawyer, judge, and Chief Justice of the Connecticut Supreme Court
Eric Campbell (2005) – former professional baseball player (Oakland Athletics, Seattle Mariners)
Andrew Carignan (2004) – former professional baseball player (San Francisco Giants)
Charles Frederic Chapman (1900) – boater, editor, and writer
Scott Chiasson (1995) – former professional baseball player
Charles W. Comstock, ? – Connecticut judge and United States Attorney for the District of Connecticut
William J. Evans (1942) – Air Force general; former commander-in-chief of United States Air Forces in Europe
John H. Fanning, ? – lawyer; member and chairman of the National Labor Relations Board
Sidney Frank (1938) – businessman
Edwin W. Higgins – U.S. representative from Connecticut
Henry Jerome (1935) – band leader and record company executive
Henry Watson Kent – librarian and museum administrator; later became NFA faculty
Bill Krohn (1976) – professional distance runner
Wally Lamb (1968) – author (She's Come Undone, I Know This Much Is True)
Edwin H. Land (1926) – scientist and inventor, co-founder of Polaroid
Barbara Latham – painter, printer, children's book illustrator
Dominic Leone (2009) – professional baseball player (San Francisco Giants)
 Joseph S. Longo – associate justice of the Connecticut Supreme Court
Ida Mae Martinez – professional wrestler and yodeler
John D. McWilliams – U.S. representative from Connecticut; transferred to Mercersburg Academy
William J. Mills, ? – jurist and last governor of New Mexico Territory
Cathy Osten (1973) – Connecticut senator
Robert J. Papp, Jr. (1970) – Coast Guard admiral; former Commandant of the United States Coast Guard
Don Pardo (1937) – television announcer (Saturday Night Live)
Dewey H. Perry (1917), US Marshal for Vermont
Samuel O. Prentice – Chief Justice of the Supreme Court of Connecticut
Esther Rome – women's health activist, writer
William Albert Setchell – botanist, marine phycologist
Matt Shaughnessy (2005) – professional football player (New Orleans Saints)
Tuzar Skipper (2014) – professional football player (Pittsburgh Steelers)
William A. Slater – businessperson, art collector, philanthropist
Pete Slosberg (1968) – brewer, founder of Pete's Brewing Company
Dean Trantalis (1971) – mayor of Fort Lauderdale, Florida
Edmund Asa Ware, ? – educator, president of Atlanta University

Notable faculty
Paul Faulkner, artist
Henry Watson Kent, librarian and museum administrator; also NFA alumnus
Wally Lamb, author
Alexey von Schlippe, artist

See also

List of high school football rivalries more than 100 years old
Other Connecticut private academies acting as public high schools:
 Gilbert School
 Woodstock Academy
Other private academies acting as public high schools:
 Pinkerton Academy

References

External links
 

Buildings and structures in Norwich, Connecticut
Schools in New London County, Connecticut
Educational institutions established in 1854
Public high schools in Connecticut
1854 establishments in Connecticut